Giorgio Fidenato (born Mereto di Tomba in Province of Udine, 7 March 1961) is an Italian libertarian farmer, co-founder and coordinator of the Movimento Libertario and secretary of Futuragra a cultural association of Pordenone for technological innovation, business culture, defense of private property and free markets in agriculture.

He is also president of Agricoltori Federati – Italian Federated Farmers.

References

1961 births
Living people
People from the Province of Udine
Italian activists
Italian human rights activists
Italian libertarians
Italian abortion-rights activists
Italian tax resisters